Resist is the thirteenth studio album by Australian band Midnight Oil, released on 18 February 2022 by Sony Music Australia. The album will be supported by the band's final Australian and New Zealand tour, concluding in May 2022 with guitarist Jim Moginie saying "We've played intensely physical gigs since our humble beginnings back in 1977 and we never want to take even the slightest risk of compromising that." Despite this being the group's final tour, all members are still open to recording in the future. 

At the 2022 ARIA Music Awards, the album was nominated for Best Group, while the tour was nominated for Best Australian Live Act.

Background
In 2017, Midnight Oil returned from a long hiatus, toured Australia and Europe before returning to the studio for the first time in over 18 years and recorded 20 new songs. The first collection of that material formed The Makarrata Project, which debuted at number one on the ARIA Chart on the same weekend that long-time bass player Bones Hillman died.

On 26 November 2021, Midnight Oil announced the release of their 13th studio album, Resist featuring the other 12 new songs they recorded with Hillman. The album became available for preorder from 30 November 2021 and is scheduled for release on 18 February 2022.

On 17 December 2021, the second single "Tarkine" was released. The song had already been debuted live on the 2019 tour.

On 4 February 2022, the album's third single "At the Time of Writing" was released.

On 18 February 2022, "We Resist" was send to radio as the album's fourth single.

Critical reception

Jeff Jenkins from Stack said "the Oils have never been a band to rest on their laurels, and that remains the case here. Put simply, Resist is a thrill from start to finish." concluding the review saying "If Resist is the end of the road for Midnight Oil, it's one to treasure."

Josh Leeson from the Newcastle Herald said "Midnight Oil's farewell album Resist delivers everything Oils fans could have hoped for. It's direct and passionate, but the rage has been tempered by a sense of failure. Peter Garrett once sung 'The time has come / To say fair's fair' but on Resist'''s opening track 'Rising Seas' he bemoans that his generation could have already failed the youth through inaction on climate change." Leeson adds "Resist has certainly whet the appetite for Midnight Oil's farewell tour. They sign off as Australia's greatest political band, who still have something poignant to say. It's now up to the new generation to keep pushing that battering ram forward."The Australian said "On a collection aptly named Resist, the Sydney rock band retains its trademark urgency and instrumental dynamics laced with lyrical vitriol."

Commercial performance
In Australia, Resist debuted atop the ARIA Albums Chart for the chart dated 28 February 2022, becoming the band's fifth number one album and the second Australian number one album of that year. In response to the news, Midnight Oil issued a press statement criticising the Morrison government, stating: "We've been fortunate to have some great media support, particularly from the ABC and Triple M, but clearly the federal government needs to introduce better local content rules—and better enforcement of those rules—across all platforms to make sure that the next generation of local artists get a fair go." The band noted that only four other Australian releases featured in that week's top 40 albums— F*ck Love by the Kid Laroi (number 13), Are You Haunted? by Methyl Ethel (number 22), The Very Best by INXS (number 35), and The Slow Rush'' by Tame Impala (number 36), respectively.

Track listing

Personnel
Midnight Oil
 Peter Garrett – lead vocals
 Bones Hillman – bass, vocals
 Robert Hirst – drums, vocals
 Jim Moginie – guitars, keyboards, vocals
 Martin Rotsey – guitars

Additional musicians
 Evelyn Finnerty - violin (3)
 Andy Bickers - saxophones (4, 12)
 Julian Thompson - cello (11)
 Kamahl - speech (12)

Production
 Warne Livesey - production, mixing, additional keyboards
 Jim Moginie - additional engineering
 Chris Allgood & Emily Lazar - mastering

Charts

Weekly charts

Year-end charts

References

2022 albums
Midnight Oil albums
Albums about climate change
Sony Music Australia albums